No.2 Hamada Dam is a gravity dam located in Shimane Prefecture in Japan. The dam is used for flood control. The catchment area of the dam is 37.4 km2. The dam impounds about 47  ha of land when full and can store 15470 thousand cubic meters of water. The construction of the dam was started on 1990.

References

Dams in Shimane Prefecture
1990 establishments in Japan